El Higo is a village in El Higo Municipality in the Mexican state of Veracruz. It is located in the state's Huasteca Alta region. 

In the 2005 INEGI Census, the village of El Higo  reported a total population of 7,844.

References

Populated places in Veracruz